The Pocono Conference of 30 March to 2 April 1948 was the second of three postwar conferences held to discuss quantum physics; arranged by Robert Oppenheimer for the National Academy of Sciences. It followed the Shelter Island Conference of 1947 and preceded the Oldstone Conference of 1949. 

Held at the Pocono Manor Inn in the Pocono Mountains of Pennsylvania, midway between Scranton, Pennsylvania and the Delaware Water Gap, 28 physicists attended. New participants were Niels Bohr, Aage Bohr, Paul Dirac, Walter Heitler, Eugene Wigner and Gregor Wentzel; while Kramers, MacInnes, Nordsieck, Pauling and Van Vleck who were at the Shelter Island Conference were absent. 

Julian Schwinger gave a day-long presentation of his developments in quantum electrodynamics (QED), the last great fling of the old way of doing quantum mechanics. Richard Feynman offered his version of quantum electrodynamics, introducing Feynman diagrams for the first time; it was unfamiliar and no-one followed it, so Feynman was motivated to go back to Cornell and write his work up for publication so others could see it in cold print. Schwinger and Feynman compared notes; and although neither could really understand the other’s approach, their arrival at the same answer helped to confirm the theory. And on his return to Princeton, Oppenheimer received a third version by Sin-Itiro Tomonaga; his version of QED was somewhat simpler than Schwinger's.

References 

 
 

Physics conferences
History of science and technology in the United States 
Foundational quantum physics
1948 in science
1948 in the United States
1948 conferences
1948 in Pennsylvania
Science events in the United States
April 1948 events in the United States